This is a list of the Australian moth species of the family Eupterotidae. It also acts as an index to the species articles and forms part of the full List of moths of Australia.

Eupterotinae
Cotana neurina Turner, 1922
Cotana serranotata (T.P. Lucas, 1894)
Eupterote expansa (T.P. Lucas, 1891)

Panacelinae
Panacela lewinae (Lewin, 1805)
Panacela nyctopa (Turner, 1922)
Panacela syntropha Turner, 1922

External links 
Eupterotidae at Australian Faunal Directory

Australia